David Hartley may refer to:

 David Hartley (philosopher) (1705–1757), English philosopher
 David Hartley (the Younger) (1732–1813), son of the philosopher and signatory to the Treaty of Paris
 David Hartley (computer scientist) (born 1937), British computer scientist
 David Hartley (cricketer) (born 1963), English cricketer
 David Hartley (rugby league), rugby league footballer in the 1960s and 1970s
 David Hartley (figure skater), British figure skater
 David Hartley (musician), songwriter and arranger who collaborated with Sting
 David Hartley (politician), former member of the Ohio House of Representatives
 David Hartley (died 1770), leader of English counterfeiting gang Cragg Vale Coiners

See also 
Hartley (disambiguation)